Oluchi Mercy Okorie (born 28 August 1981 in Lagos) is a former Nigerian basketball player who played for First Bank B.C and the Nigerian national team. She represented Nigeria at the 2005, 2006 and 2007 FIBA Africa Championship.

Sports career
From 20 December to 28 December, at the Indoor Sports Hall in Abuja, Nigeria hosted the FIBA Africa Championship for Women in 2005. At the event, Oluchi represented Nigeria and won a gold medal.

At the 2006 FIBA Africa Women's Clubs Champions Cup in which she participated, Oluchi won a bronze medal.

References

External links 
 Oluchi Mercy Okorie - FIBA

1981 births
Living people
Nigerian women's basketball players
Sportspeople from Lagos